Tariq Kennedy Monteiro (born 27 February 2000), known professionally as Sus or Suspect, is a British rapper; he is part of the UK drill group Active Gxng (also known as AGB), based in the Agar Grove estate within Camden Town, London. He released his debut album, Suspicious Activity, in 2022. He is of Guinean and Moroccan descent.

Early life 

In 2014, Monteiro was reported as missing from his foster home in Tottenham; at the time, he was in the care of Camden London Borough Council.

Career

In 2020, Sus released "Turn Up" alongside T Scam; GRM Daily described the song as "offload[ing] some unapologetically honest bars...aimed at certain people in their lives." He also appeared on Fumez the Engineer's Plugged In series alongside 2smokeyy.

In January 2021, he appeared on "Who's Bad" alongside Swavey, Yevz and 2smokeyy; this was followed by the release of "Block Heroes" with Nino in February and "MoonWalk" in March. In August, he appeared on "Double Tap" by Fredo, which appeared on Independence Day; it peaked at number 73 on the UK Singles Chart. He also appeared on Mixtape Madness's The Cold Room series with T Scam.

In September, Sus appeared on a remix of "Snap It" by SR and on "Woosh & Push" by Loski. In October, he released "Encore", noted by GRM Daily as "a quality release that showcases Suspect’s deep cadence and his engaging bars." He released "Freestyle" in December.

In 2022, he released "Frostbite" with Nino Uptown. He also released his debut album, Suspicious Activity, in February.

Legal issues
In 2022, Monteiro was arrested with Swavey (real name Siyad Mohammed) in Nairobi, Kenya for the 2019 murder of 16-year old Alex Smith. Currently, Sus awaits trial which will take place in March 2023.

Discography

Albums
Suspicious Activity (2022)

Charted singles

Guest appearances

References

2000 births
Living people
UK drill musicians
Rappers from London
English male rappers
Gangsta rappers
People charged with murder